John Doll (born July 3, 1957) is a Republican member of the Kansas Senate, representing the 39th district since 2017. Prior to 2018, he was a Republican, serving as a member of the Kansas House of Representatives from 2013 to 2017, representing the 123rd district (part of Garden City in Finney County). From 2010 to 2011, he served as the mayor of Garden City, Kansas.  On March 7, 2018, Doll announced that he would register as an independent and would be the running mate of independent gubernatorial candidate Greg Orman in the gubernatorial election in 2018 to become the next Lieutenant Governor of Kansas. He rejoined the Republican Party in 2019.

Sources

External links
State Legislature Page
Ballotpedia
Votesmart
John Doll's Blog at Daily Kos

1957 births
21st-century American politicians
Emporia State University alumni
Kansas Independents
Kansas Republicans
Living people
People from Dodge City, Kansas
People from Garden City, Kansas
St. Mary of the Plains College alumni
Kansas state senators
Members of the Kansas House of Representatives